Zelominor is a genus of ground spiders first described by R. Snazell & J. Murphy in 1997.  it contains only three species: Z. algarvensis, Z. algericus, and Z. malagensis.

References

Araneomorphae genera
Gnaphosidae
Spiders of Africa